Aki Lindén is a Finnish Member of Parliament, representing the Social Democratic Party of Finland from the constituency of Finland Proper.

Prior to being elected as MP in 2019, Lindén worked in healthcare administration, retiring from his career as the CEO of the Joint Authority of the Helsinki and Uusimaa Hospital District, the largest healthcare provider in Finland, in 2018. He is a proponent of the welfare state.

His interest with politics was sparked in secondary school. Lindén was first active in student organisations, entering party politics during his university years. He served in the city council of Turku from 1977 up until 1997. Owing to his lengthy career in healthcare, he is an active influencer in health policy.

References

Living people
Ministers of Social Affairs of Finland
Members of the Parliament of Finland (2019–23)
Social Democratic Party of Finland politicians
21st-century Finnish politicians
1952 births